No. 656 Squadron RAF was an Air Observation Post unit of the Royal Air Force in India and Burma during the Second World War and afterwards in British Malaya. Numbers 651 to 663 Squadron of the RAF were Air Observation Post units working closely with British Army units in artillery spotting and liaison. Their duties and squadron numbers were transferred to the Army with the formation of the Army Air Corps on 1 September 1957 With this it became 656 Light Aircraft Squadron Army Air Corps.

History

Formation and World War II
No. 656 Squadron was formed at RAF Westley on 31 December 1942. It embarked for India in August 1943 and went into action during the Burma campaign with the Fourteenth Army. Several officers were decorated, among them Captain Edward Maslen-Jones who was awarded the Distinguished Flying Cross and the Military Cross.

The squadron was to take part in the Allied invasion of Malaya, but the Japanese surrendered before this took place and the squadron disbanded on 15 January 1947.

Reformation and Operation Firedog

The squadron reformed from No. 1914 Flight RAF on 29 June 1948 at Sembawang in Malaya and served in British Malaya to support Army and Police against Communist guerillas before it went over to Army control in September 1957. 656 Squadron performed a total of 143,000 operations in Malaya during Operation Firedog.

No. 1914 Air Observation Post Flight was formed within 656 Squadron.

Aircraft operated

References

Notes

Bibliography

External links
 656 Squadron, Army Air Corps
 Squadron histories for nos. 651–670 squadron on RAFWeb
 656 Squadron Association

656 Squadron
Aircraft squadrons of the Royal Air Force in World War II
Military units and formations established in 1942